Hōjō Akitoki (1248 – 7 May 1301) was a Japanese military leader during the Kamakura period (1185–1333).

Akitoki was the son of Kanezawa Sanetoki and a daughter of Hōjō Masamura.  In 1257 Akitoki had his genpuku coming-of-age ceremony under the tokusō Hōjō Tokiyori and took the name Tokikata.  In 1260 he became a guard of the shōgun; he attended Prince Munetaka and studied poetry and other subjects.  He may have married Mugai Nyodai, but that is disputed, with some believing she was married to Hōjō Sanetoki.

Akitoki died 7 May 1301 and was succeeded by his son Hōjō Sadaaki. He is said to have had a love of learning, like his father, and to have contributed to the establishment of the Kanazawa Bunko.

References

Works cited

 
 
 
 

1248 births
1301 deaths
Hōjō clan